Binnakandi Ghat is a village under Binnakandi Gaon Panchayat in the District of Cachar (Assam), India under Lakhipur sub division.

Festive photos

Notable People
Dinesh Prasad Goala - Former MLA of Lakhipur 
Rajdeep Goala - Former MLA of Lakhipur

References

Villages in Cachar district